James Paul "Bo" Clark (born April 24, 1957) is an American former college basketball coach and author. He was the head men's basketball coach at Flagler College in for 31 years and led his teams to 491 wins. In his tenure, the Saints qualified for three National Association of Intercollegiate Athletics (NAIA) national basketball tournaments. The court at Flagler is named in his honor. The "Clark Family Court" was dedicated on February 18, 2017. Clark is also the career points leader for the University of Central Florida.

Early life 
Born in Appleton, Wis., he is the son of former Xavier High School (Appleton, Wis.) and University of Central Florida basketball coaching legend, Gene "Torchy" Clark. The younger Clark played for his father at UCF and was a three-time NCAA Division II All-American. He is the school's all-time leading scorer with 2,886 points. On January 30, 1977, Clark scored 70 points in a game against Florida Memorial University. He also played one season for Athletes In Action USA (1980–81). Clark's No. 23 jersey is retired at both Bishop Moore Catholic High School, in Orlando, Fla., and at UCF.

Honors

High school 
 3× Florida Class AAA All-State selection at Orlando's Bishop Moore High School (1973–1975)
 All-Central Florida (1974, 1975)
 3× All-Metro Conference (1973–1975)
 Bishop Moore Catholic Hall of Fame inductee (1992)

College 
 4× All-Sunshine State Conference (1976, 1977, 1979, 1980)
 UCF's all-time leading scorer (2,886 points) and is first in scoring average (27.8 ppg), field goals (1,215), and field goals attempted (2,418) 
 Ranks 15th all-time in NCAA Division II scoring with 2,886 points 
 Led NCAA Division II in scoring with 31.6 points per game average (1978–79)
 UCF Hall of Fame inductee (1998)

Coaching 
 2× NAIA Division II National Tournament Sweet 16 (2002, 2003)
 2× Florida Sun Conference regular season championships (2002, 2003)
 2× Florida Sun Conference Tournament championships (2001, 2002)
 3× Florida Sun Coach of the Year (1995, 2004, 2005) 
 Independent College Athletic Association Coach of the Year (2008)
 Flagler College all-time leader in wins (491)
 Flagler Athletics Hall of Fame inductee

Head coaching record

Personal life 
Bo Clark and his wife Nancy (m. 1984), have three sons: JP, David, and Matt. He presently runs youth basketball camps, Bo Clark Basketball Camps, in St. Augustine, Altamonte Springs, and Winter Park, Florida.

References 

1957 births
Living people
American men's basketball players
Basketball players from Orlando, Florida
College men's basketball head coaches in the United States
Flagler Saints
High school basketball coaches in Florida
Shooting guards
UCF Knights men's basketball players